McEntegart is a surname. Notable people with the surname include:

Bryan Joseph McEntegart (1893–1968), American Catholic prelate
Pete McEntegart, American sportswriter
Sean McEntegart (born 1970), Irish footballer